Rowland Bailey (5 October 1876 – 24 March 1950) was an Australian cricketer. He played one first-class cricket match for Victoria in 1913.

See also
 List of Victoria first-class cricketers

References

External links
 

1876 births
1950 deaths
Australian cricketers
Victoria cricketers
Cricketers from Melbourne